Elijah Boardman (1760–1823) was a U.S. Senator from Connecticut from 1821  1823. Senator Boardman may also refer to:

Halsey J. Boardman (1834–1900), Massachusetts State Senate
Truman Boardman (1810–1895), New York State Senate
William Whiting Boardman (1794–1871), Connecticut State Senate